Israel Jacobson (17 October 1768, Halberstadt – 14 September 1828, Berlin) was a German-Jewish philanthropist and communal organiser. Jacobson pioneered political, educational and religious reforms in the early days of Jewish emancipation, and while he lacked a systematic religious approach, he is also considered one of the heralds of Reform Judaism.

Origins
The only son of wealthy businessman and philanthropist Israel Jacob (philanthropist), Jacobson's parents lived modestly yet contributed considerably to reducing the community debt. Owing to the very low level of efficiency of the Halberstadt public schools, Israel attended mainly the Jewish religious school, in his leisure hours studying German literature and the works of Gotthold Ephraim Lessing and Moses Mendelssohn on his own account. His level of understanding of rabbinic literature and Hebrew led professors at the University of Helmstedt, where he was eventually granted a degree, to declare that Jacobson was a Hebrew scholar.

At the age of eighteen, after having accumulated a small fortune, he married Mink Samson, the daughter of respected financier Herz Samson and granddaughter of Philip Samson, founder of the Samson-Schule at Wolfenbüttel, at which Leopold Zunz and Isaak Markus Jost were educated. Through the Samson family, Jacobson became friends with Charles William Ferdinand, Duke of Brunswick and Lunenburg, Prince of Wolfenbüttel, favorite nephew of Frederick II of Prussia. Jacobson took up his residence in Brunswick and, possessing great financial ability, rapidly increased his fortune. It was through Jacobson's influence and persuasion that in 1803 the so-called "Leibzoll" (poll-tax), then levied from Jews in many German states, was abolished in the ducal Brunswick-Lunenburgian Principality of Wolfenbüttel.

Developing a belief in egalitarian and religious pluralism in education, he established (1801) in Seesen, near the Harz Mountains, a school in which forty children of Jewish parents and twenty children of Christian parents were to be educated together, receiving free board and lodging. This close association of children of different creeds was a favorite idea of his. The Jacobson school soon obtained a wide reputation, and hundreds of pupils from neighboring places were educated there. During the hundred years of its existence, it has stood foremost in every line of educational work.

Accomplishments
Jacobson very soon perceived the necessity of imbuing the young as early as possible with proper religious impressions. In 1810 he built a beautiful temple within the school grounds and showed his sympathies for reforming ritual by adding Hymns in German that were sung by a choir of boys, and prayers in German were added to those in Hebrew and Aramaic. He also had a pipe organ installed. Though not unheard of in synagogues before, its subsequent association with the new movement would later anathemize the organ in the eyes of the Orthodox in Central Europe (albeit it was introduced, without controversy, in France and Italy). The progressive nature of his views was further shown by his strong advocacy of the introduction of confirmation. In the Seesen temple it was Jacobson himself who confirmed the first five Jewish boys. When, under Napoleon's rule, the Kingdom of Westphalia was created, and the emperor's brother Jérôme Bonaparte was placed at its head, Jacobson, who had removed to the residence of the king at Cassel, was appointed president of the Jewish consistory, established on 3 March 1808. In his capacity as consistorial president, assisted by a board of officers, he did his best to exercise a reforming influence upon the various congregations of the country. He also advocated a seminary for the training of Jewish teachers. A double portrait of him and his first wife Mink Samson, painted by the Jewish court-painter Salomon Pinhas (ca. 1808) is at the European Art collection of the Israel Museum, Jerusalem.

Jacobson's innovations were quite restrained, and more importantly his mode of thought was still within a traditional framework. He justified himself on conventional halachic grounds, later enlisting scholars to write responsa in favour of his worship style. His role in the introduction of these early reforms made him a founding figure in the eyes of some partisans of Reform Judaism, but Michael A. Meyer noted that he lacked either a comprehensive approach or a sense of principled critique. His religious worldview, according to Meyer, did not stray beyond that of late maskilim; he "was not a conscious Reformer", interested in modifying religious mechanisms themselves, only exteriors. While his associates, mainly Eduard Kley, would later publish the first unequivocal Reform liturgy in 1818, effecting a concerted Orthodox backlash, the Westphalian Consistory's aroused little ire at their time. Its reforms were adopted by German neo-Orthodoxy, and Rabbi Samson Raphael Hirsch "integrated fully into his worldview the program of the moderate Haskalah and even the aesthetic reforms of the Westphalian consistory."

After the Duchy of Mecklenburg-Schwerin emancipated its Jewish subjects in 1813, Jacobson bought in that duchy two feudal manor estates, Klenz and Gehmkendorf and the peasant village Klein Markow (all three are components of today's Jördenstorf). In 1816 he swore his oath of fealty to Frederick Francis I, Grand Duke of Mecklenburg-Schwerin, thus becoming the first Jew with a permanent seat and vote in the Estates of the Realm of a German state. As feudal lord he also held the patrimonial jurisdiction over his vassal peasants and the patronage of the pertaining Lutheran churches, which he conveyed to a Lutheran confidant. In 1817 he further acquired the neighbouring estates of Grambow and Tressow. His life and work, especially this part, is commemorated—among other things—in the permanent exhibition on Mecklenburg's Jewish history in the museum Engelscher Hof and the half-timbered former synagogue in Röbel, 66 km south of Jördenstorf.

After Napoleon's fall (1815) Jacobson moved to Berlin, where he continued to introduce reforms in beliefs and divine service. For this purpose he opened in his own house a hall for worship in which eloquent sermons were delivered by Zunz, Eduard Kley (1789–1867), and Isaak Lewin Auerbach. Eduard Kley founded in 1817 the Hamburg Temple in this spirit. -  However, the Prussian government, remembering the French sympathies of Jacobson, and receiving continued complaints from the Orthodox rabbis, ordered the services at Jacobson's house discontinued. Jacobson, using the title Consistorial President rtrd., aroused some unrest among Protestant clergy in Berlin, who considered that title to be exclusive for the retired consistorial presidents of the Evangelical Church in Prussia.

Throughout his life Jacobson seized every opportunity to promote a cordial understanding between Jews and Christians, and his great wealth enabled him to support many poor of both faiths. His grave is preserved in the Jewish cemetery on Schönhauser Allee in Berlin.

References

Allgemeine Deutsche Biographie, xiii. 619;
Fürst, Bibl. Jud. ii.6.

Marcus, Jacob Rader (1972) Israel Jacobson: The Founder of the Reform Movement in Judaism. Cincinnati: Hebrew Union College Press. .

External links

1768 births
1828 deaths
Court Jews
People from Halberstadt
People from the Principality of Halberstadt
German Reform Jews
18th-century German businesspeople
19th-century German businesspeople